Lynda Holt (born 9 March 1972) is an Australian Paralympic athlete. She won a silver medal at the 2000 Sydney Games in the Women's Shot Put F55 event. In 2020, Holt decided to re-enter the sporting arena and compete again after her initial retirement in 2002, which at the time ended her 21-year sporting career.

Personal
She was born in Perth, Western Australia on 9 March 1972 and grew up in Perth and has one sister. She was born with spina bifida. She started on callipers and then moved full time to a wheelchair at aged 10.  In 1979 Holt was the Telethon Child, which was a Channel 7 fundraiser for children with a disability. After leaving High School she attended Leederville TAFE where she completed her course in office and secretarial studies. Holt Worked in many industries such as Medical Emergency and recruitment  and established her own business.  After further study in human behaviour she opened a The “Live Well Centre” in Crows Nest, New South Wales which offered a mixture of holistic natural medicines and mainstream psychology services.  In 2017,  Holt moved into the disability sector once the NDIS (National Disability Insurance Scheme) was created and opened another business “Choice Consultancy Pty Ltd” which offered services to both disabled and aged care clients.

Competitive sports career
At the age of 9 Holt found wheelchair sports, it was at this club that she met Louise Sauvage who she competed with as they were in the same class and became great friends with as they both followed a love of sports. Initially trying all the sports on offer athletics, swimming, basketball, slalom and track, it did not take long for Holt to discover her love for shot put and discus.  She competed in her first national championships in Adelaide, South Australia in 1981.  Holt continued to compete in national championships around Australia until her late teens and continued to hold her national records the entire time. Holt first represented Australia in 1988 when she was part of a junior team who flew to the US, East Tennessee to compete internationally.

At the 1998 IPC Athletics World Championships in Birmingham, England, she won two bronze medals - Womenm's Shot Put F55 with throw of  6.48m and Women's Discus with throw of 18.96m. She trained 6 sessions a week, which included throwing training, basketball, strength training and weights in the lead up to 2000 Sydney Paralympics.> She won the silver medal in Women's Shot Put F55 with a throw of 7.03m/ In the higher class of F58, she finished tenth in the Women's Discus with a throw of 20.94m. Frank Ponta was one of Holt's first coaches who continued with her through to the Sydney Paralympics and until she retired in 2002

Holt decided to come out of retirement in 2019 and started again competing in both shot put and discus with the hope of once again representing Australia at a future Paralympics.

References

External links
Athletics Australia Results
Lynda Holt Shot Put 2000 Sydney Paralympics - YouTube

1972 births
Living people
Paralympic athletes of Australia
Athletes (track and field) at the 2000 Summer Paralympics
Paralympic silver medalists for Australia
Sportswomen from Western Australia
Australian female shot putters
Australian female discus throwers
Medalists at the 2000 Summer Paralympics
Athletes from Perth, Western Australia
People with spina bifida
Paralympic medalists in athletics (track and field)
20th-century Australian women
21st-century Australian women
Wheelchair discus throwers
Wheelchair shot putters
Paralympic discus throwers
Paralympic shot putters